The crystal seal of Mani (English: Crystal sealstone of Mani or Manichean Rock-Crystal Seal) is a crystal stone with intaglio busts of three Manichean elect. There is a circle of Syriac writing around the intaglio, which could have been a personal seal used by Mani, the founder of Manichaeism. It is the oldest surviving piece of Manichaean art, and the only piece from Sassanid Mesopotamia. It is now in the collection of the National Library of France in Paris.

Description 
According to the research by Hungarian Asian religious art historian Gu Leci, the seal was used between 240 and 274 or 277 AD. She believes that this crystal stone is a unique piece of art. Its uniqueness is not only because of its historical value, but also because of its artistic characteristics that are completely different from other ancient Iranian gem seals. This crystal was originally inlaid in a metal rim, and has two functions: first, its concave surface is used as a seal; second, the intaglio images and inscriptions seen through its round convex surface will appear as embossed. It can be worn as a gem-engraved necklace ornament. The Syrian inscriptions engraved around must also be visible through the convex surface: "M’ny šlyḥ’ d-yyšw‘ mšyḥ’", interpreted as "Mani, the apostle of Jesus Christ". Therefore, this seal is the first Manichaean artwork to mention Jesus. In the original sentence, "Apostle" (Apostle) means "Messenger", and "Jesus Christ" actually means "Messiah" (Messiah). In the early Manichaean literature, this sentence is often used as the beginning of the religious letters written by Mani.

References 

Manichaean art
Sasanian Empire